Myladi is a village in Kerala, India.

References 

Villages in Malappuram district
Nilambur area